Attaher Mohamed El-Mahjoub is a Libyan table tennis player. He competed in the men's singles event at the 1992 Summer Olympics.

References

Year of birth missing (living people)
Living people
Libyan male table tennis players
Olympic table tennis players of Libya
Table tennis players at the 1992 Summer Olympics
Place of birth missing (living people)